Jorge Luis Echarte y Mazorra (17 February 1891, in Havana, Cuba – July 1979, in Fort Lauderdale, Broward County, Florida, USA) was a Cuban architect, engineer, diplomat and minister. He served as the Cuban Minister of Public Works (1935–1936) and as the Foreign Minister (1936–1937) during the presidency of José Agripino Barnet.

One of his most prominent projects Echarte designed was the home of Alberto de Armas on the Quinta Avenida in 1926, which in 2008 was being restored.

Echarte was married to Carmen Romero Ochoterena and they had three children: Maria Teresa, Dr. Luis J., and Jorge Echarte Romero.

After Fidel Castro overthrew Fulgencio Batista in 1959, Echarte went into exile in Fort Lauderdale, Florida.

References and external links
  (Spanish)

References 

Cuban architects
Cuban diplomats
Foreign ministers of Cuba
1891 births
1979 deaths
1930s in Cuba
20th-century Cuban politicians
Cuban emigrants to the United States